Calicium episcalare is a rare species of pin lichen that is known from only a single locality in Sweden. It one of the few Calicium species that is parasitic on another lichen. The type was found growing on the north-facing wall of an old wooden barn in Dalsland. The barn, which dates to the 17th century, was made from old pine wood and had likely never been painted. The specific epithet episcalare refers to the name of the host, Hypocenomyce scalaris, a common and widespread lichen. Calicium episcalare was described as a new species in 2016 by Swedish lichenologists Leif Tibell and Tommy Knutsson.

References

episcalare
Lichen species
Lichens described in 2016
Fungi of Sweden
Taxa named by Leif Tibell